The Old Tote Theatre Company (1963–1978) was a New South Wales theatre company that began as the standing acting and theatre company of Australia's National Institute of Dramatic Art (NIDA). It was the predecessor to the Sydney Theatre Company. The Old Tote was one of the leading Australian theatre companies.

History 
The Old Tote Theatre was established in 1962 by the National Institute of Dramatic Art (NIDA), which had been created in 1958. It began in a converted tin shed on the campus of University of New South Wales in Sydney. The wood and corrugated iron building (originally an army recreation hall) became known as the "Old Tote" because it had previously been part of the group of buildings that had formerly housed the totalisator betting machine when the site had been Kensington Racecourse. The building still stands, and is now known as the Figtree Theatre.

The company was founded by the University's Professor of Drama, Robert Quentin, and NIDA Director, Tom Brown.  The University contributed six thousand pounds to convert the building into a theatre and its debut production, which opened on 2 February 1963, was a highly successful production of Anton Chekhov's The Cherry Orchard, starring Sophie Stewart and her husband Ellis Irving, with Gordon Chater as Yepihodov, John Bell as Trefimov and Ron Haddrick as Gayev, which ran for almost two months. This was followed by a double bill of The Bald Prima Donna and The Fire Raisers, with a cast that including Brian James, Gwen Plumb, Neil Fitzpatrick, Anna Volska and Jack Allan. Other productions in the first season included Hamlet, with John Bell in the title role, and Playboy of the Western World. The first season was an outstanding success and was extended to 28 weeks, with an average nightly capacity of 95%.

In 1967 it was proposed to replace the old building with a new complex housing NIDA, the School of Drama and a larger theatre, but this plan was never carried out. In the same year, the Old Tote was separated from NIDA, moving its headquarters to the old Parade Theatre, in a building still on the UNSW campus. The company's inaugural performance in that venue was on 7 May 1969 with Robin Lovejoy's production of Tom Stoppard's Rosencrantz and Guildenstern Are Dead. The move came with a subsidy from the newly-created Australian Council for the Arts, and the Old Tote then embarked on a policy of expansion and at the request of the state government it took on the responsibilities of a state theatre company. This led to commitments to stage productions at both the Sydney Opera House and the Seymour Centre as well as at the Parade.

The Old Tote company went on to occupy the Drama Theatre of the Sydney Opera House from 1973 to 1978 and also toured some of the shows around Australia, including Rosencrantz and Guildenstern are Dead to the Canberra Theatre Centre. However these additional activities, compounded by lack of support from the New South Wales state government, overstretched the company's resources and in 1978 the Old Tote went into liquidation.

Alumni 
Many distinguished and much-loved actors, such as Ruth Cracknell, Ron Haddrick, Neil Fitzpatrick, Jacki Weaver, John Bell, Dinah Shearing, Helmut Bakaitis, Robyn Nevin, Elizabeth Alexander, Reg Livermore, Dennis Olsen, Gary Files, Robin Lovejoy and Jennifer Hagan, appeared in more than 90 productions of the classics and contemporary plays from the international repertoire.
Jim Sharman became interested in directing experimental theatre and he soon made a name for himself in Sydney with his groundbreaking productions at the Old Tote Theatre Company many of which were designed by his long-time collaborator Brian Thomson. Renowned director Richard Wherrett also directed productions for the Old Tote.

See also
 Kenneth Shave

References

External links
 NIDA
 Sydney Theatre Company website
 

Theatre in Sydney
Theatre companies in Australia
1963 establishments in Australia
1978 disestablishments in Australia